Exchange Tower is a 36 storey  tower in the First Canadian Place complex of Toronto, Ontario, Canada completed in 1981. The International style building is named for the Toronto Stock Exchange, which is the building's highest profile tenant. The building was built on the site of the William H. Wright Building.

Located in the heart of Toronto’s Financial District at the corner of King and York Streets, the Exchange Tower is also home to National Bank Financial, offices of the federal Department of Justice, and the Toronto campus of the University of Western Ontario's Ivey Business School. In April 2018, Restaurant Brands International announced that they would be moving their head office into the Exchange Tower.

References

External links
 Exchange Tower at Brookfield Properties

PATH (Toronto)
Skyscrapers in Toronto
Brookfield Properties buildings
Skyscraper office buildings in Canada
Office buildings completed in 1983
International style architecture in Canada